Bresilley is a commune in the Haute-Saône department in the region of Bourgogne-Franche-Comté in eastern France.

Geography
Bresilley is situated beside the Ognon river, which rises in the Vosges mountains and joins the Saône at Pontailler-sur-Saône.

See also
Communes of the Haute-Saône department

References

Communes of Haute-Saône